Cosmoplatus is a genus of beetles in the family Cerambycidae, containing the following species:

 Cosmoplatus brasilianus Zajciw, 1963
 Cosmoplatus peruvianus Aurivillius, 1891
Cosmoplatus polis Hernandez, Santos-Silva & Nascimento, 2019

References

Compsocerini